Sharps Pixley was a British bullion house. It was formed in 1957 when two private bullion partnerships merged: Sharps Wilkins, founded in 1740, and Pixley & Abell, founded in 1852. It was one of the five firms that met twice daily for the London Gold Fixing, the others being N. M. Rothschild & Sons, Johnson Matthey, Mocatta & Goldsmid, and Samuel Montagu & Co. Sharps Pixley was bought by Kleinwort Benson in 1966, largely at the behest of the Bank of England.

References 

British companies established in 1957
Companies based in the City of London
Bullion dealers
Gold in the United Kingdom
Business services companies established in 1957
1957 establishments in England